City Hospital, one of the first medical dramas on American television, was broadcast from 1951 to 1953, first on ABC and later on CBS.

Schedule
The ABC version began on November 3, 1951, and ended on April 19, 1952. It was broadcast on CBS from March 25, 1952, until October 1, 1953, creating a period of about three weeks when both networks carried the show. The ABC version was on alternate Saturdays. The CBS version was aired on Tuesday nights until June 1953, alternating with Crime Syndicated. Then it moved to Thursday nights, alternating with Place the Face.

Cast and premise
The show starred Anne Burr as Dr. Kate Morrow and Melville Ruick as Dr. Barton Crane. Set in a large metropolitan hospital, the show dealt with both the professional and the personal sides of doctors' lives. Crane was City Hospital's medical director, and episodes usually related to him directly or as he was advising other doctors. Having Crane, a female doctor, "was rather uncommon for medical shows of this period."

John Cannon was the announcer.

Production
Walter Selden was the producer, and Cort Steen was the director. Writers were Julian Funt and Robert Newman. Sponsors were Carter's Pills, Nair, Arrid, and Rise.

References

External links

1950s American medical television series
1950s American drama television series
1951 American television series debuts
1953 American television series endings
American Broadcasting Company original programming
Black-and-white American television shows
CBS original programming